Streptomyces desertarenae is a Gram-positive and aerobic bacterium species from the genus of Streptomyces which has been isolated from sand from the Gurbantünggüt Desert in China.

See also 
 List of Streptomyces species

References 

desertarenae
Bacteria described in 2019